Everett "Cotton" Owens (May 21, 1924 – June 7, 2012) was a NASCAR driver. For five straight years (1957–61), Owens captured at least one Grand National Series win.  Owens was known as the "King of the Modifieds" for his successes in modified stock car racing in the 1950s.

Early racing career
Owens was born in Union, South Carolina.  His career began after his tour in the U.S. Navy in 1946, in the Modified division that would eventually be organized by NASCAR and pre-dated their Stock Car (Grand National, later Cup) division. Owens deservedly earned the nickname "King of the Modifieds" by claiming over 200 feature wins, including the prestigious Gulf Coast championship race.  In 1949 he entered 23 races and won 19 of them. In 1951 he sped to victories all over the South, racking up 54 wins.  Cotton put together a string of 24 straight wins in 1950–51, a feat he repeated twice! Switching from Dodge to the Chrysler-powered Plymouth he continued to dominate the Modified circuit, winning the big modified championship race at Daytona two years in succession in 1953 and 1954, and capturing the United States Modified Championship Race three times. He was the 1950, 1953, and 1954 Modified champion.

Grand National driving career
Cotton's NASCAR (Grand National) career began in 1950 when he ran three races. He finished 13th in the point standings. Owens would enter a few races over the next several seasons without a win.

Cotton's first win came on February 17, 1957, at the series' premiere event: the Daytona Beach Road Course. Owens once drove a 1957 Pontiac to victory; beating runner-up Johnny Beauchamp by 55 seconds with the first-ever 100 mph (101.541 mph) average race on the sand. The win was also Pontiac's first NASCAR win. He had his next trip to victory lane in 1958 at Monroe County Fairgrounds at Rochester, New York.

In 1959, Owens finished second to Lee Petty in the race for the championship, although he did not enter many Grand National races, as he preferred the Modified circuit which at this time had bigger crowds, faster cars, and higher purses to be won. Though he only won one race that season (at Richmond International Raceway), Owens was making a name for himself as a racer. He attempted 37 races that season, with 22 Top 10s and 13 Top 5s. In 1961 he had his most productive season with 11 Top 5s and four wins in only 17 starts. He had a win at his hometown of Spartanburg, South Carolina (Piedmont Interstate Fairgrounds).

Car owner career

1960–1965 

As Cotton transitioned to NASCAR's Grand National "Stock Car" division, he would cement his place among the sport's elite drivers building and driving Pontiacs wearing his now-signature red and white color scheme and infamous #6. What made Owens great was not only his driving ability but his mechanical aptitude and car preparation that made him a force to be reckoned with wherever he raced, on dirt or the pavement. Cotton would capture 5 Grand National victories through 1960-62 as a driver, and would also put several notable drivers behind the wheel, including Bobby Johns, Ralph Earnhardt, Marvin Panch, Fireball Roberts, Junior Johnson, and fellow Spartanburger David Pearson, who was making a name for himself as an up-and-coming driver. Cotton Owens Garage would earn 6 victories during these years, as well as 31 Top Fives and 38 Top Ten finishes, and 5 Pole Positions. Owens would put his Pontiac on Pole for the 1960 Daytona 500 and also shatter the qualifying record at Darlington with a 126.146 mph average speed.

In 1962 he hired the legendary driver and car owner Junior Johnson. He also started his relationship with fellow Spartanburg resident David Pearson. He came out of retirement in 1964 to prove that he could beat Pearson. He beat Pearson in his final career win (at Richmond). Two races later he finished second in his final career race (to Ned Jarrett).

In 1962 Chrysler Motor Company consulted Cotton Owens, Ray Nichels, Ray Fox, and Maurice Petty about its future in stock car racing. Owens mentioned to Gail Porter that Chrysler had a powerplant in the old Hemi engines of the 1950s and suggested that they convert them for modern racing. "I was more than a little surprised when he told me that if I was willing to come with Chrysler, they would build a completely new Hemi," recalls Cotton.

In 1963, Cotton would sign with Dodge as a factory team, fielding a stable of race cars for notable drivers including David Pearson, Billy Wade, Bobby Isaac, Jim Paschal, and G.C. Spencer. Pearson and Wade would be the team's top drivers, with 69 starts between them in '63. Owens built a new 20,000 sf garage behind his home, which would be the epicenter of racing in Spartanburg, South Carolina. Although the team would not win a race in their first season with Dodge, they did earn 17 Top Five and 34 Top Ten finishes, as well as 2 Pole Positions.

Chrysler released the hemispherical combustion chamber engine in 1964 and took stock car racing to a new level. 1964 would be the breakout season for the Cotton Owens team, with Owens tapping the Hemi's potential and Hotshoe David Pearson capturing 8 wins on the Grand National circuit, 29 Top Fives, and 42 Top Ten finishes as well as 12 Pole Positions in 61 starts. Owens himself would even briefly step out of retirement to show Pearson a thing or two about pit stops and taking care of his equipment at a USAC race in Richmond in 1964, where Owens wound up winning and Pearson finished second in a now-infamous race. Pearson would go on to finish 3rd in the Grand National Championship standings, setting the stage for a partnership that would see continued success in the years to come.

That success would soon be interrupted, however, as the Hemi powerplant proved to be so dominant that NASCAR banned the Hemi from competition in mid-1965, and Chrysler, in turn, boycotted NASCAR racing. Pearson did manage to run 14 races in 1965, with 2 Wins, 8 Top Fives, 11 Top Tens, and 1 Pole Position.

In 1965, the Chrysler Hemi engine was not allowed in NASCAR. Owens and Pearson boycotted NASCAR and ran a Hemi in the back of a Dodge Dart drag racing car. They ran nitro and alcohol in the Experimental class. They returned to NASCAR in 1966, and they won the Grand National Championship. They parted ways early in the 1967 season. During their six seasons together Owens and Pearson combined for 27 wins in 170 races.

1966–1967 

With dwindling factory and fan support following NASCAR's ban of the Hemi from competition in 1965, NASCAR relented in 1966 and again changed the rules to allow the Hemi back on the track, with concessions made for Ford and General Motors to help even the competition. Chrysler was intent on picking up where they left off, and indeed they did, putting full factory support and engineering resources at the disposal of the factory racing teams, with Cotton Owens Garage and the Pettys leading the charge.

1966 would be the breakout year for the Cotton Owens Dodge team, now in their fourth year and hitting full stride on the NASCAR circuit. With David Pearson as his primary driver and Cotton now out of the driver's seat and working full-time under the hood, they would go on to claim 15 victories on the Grand National tour and capture the NASCAR Championship, with 26 Top Fives and 33 Top Ten finishes, and 7 Pole Positions in 42 starts. Pearson was almost unstoppable in 1966, winning 15 times, including sweeping both races at Hickory, Winston-Salem, and Richmond. In 42 starts, he was running at the end 34 times. And of those 34, he finished out of the Top Ten just once. He was in the Top Five 26 times, including thirds in the Daytona 500 and Southern 500.

With Owens' mechanical wizardry and the Hemi engine powering the COG Dodges they were nearly unbeatable that year, and their successful partnership made hometown Spartanburg very proud indeed. Other notable drivers would climb behind the wheel for Owens in 1966–67, including Buddy Baker, Bobby Isaac, Bobby Allison, Darel Dieringer, Ray Hendrick, Sam McQuagg, and open-wheel Hotshoe Mario Andretti who would come South for the big race at Daytona and looked to Cotton to put him in a ride capable of winning. And winning was becoming commonplace at Cotton Owens Garage during its heyday of the mid-1960s.

1968–1970 

The end of the 60s saw the Cotton Owens Garage campaigning Dodges in a variety of form factors designed specifically for maximum performance at different tracks, including the Charger 500 and Charger Daytona that turned NASCAR racing on its head and forever changed the way aerodynamics would affect motorsports competition. Drivers of this era include "leadfoot" Buddy Baker, Chargin' Charlie Glotzbach, Sam Posey, open-wheel star Al Unser, and another fellow Spartanburg native by the name of James Hylton. Glotzbach would serve as the primary driver in 1968, with 19 starts and 1 victory at the Charlotte 500, as well as 9 Top Fives, 11 Top Tens, and 3 Pole Positions. Buddy Baker would be the COG primary driver in 1969 and '70, with 29 starts, 1 Win, 13 Top Fives, 17 Top Tens, and 1 Pole Position.

Baker's lone win in a Cotton Owens Dodge would come at the Darlington Southern 500 in 1970, a race Cotton wanted to win so badly but which had eluded him as a driver and owner for more than 20 years. On the Saturday night before the annual Labor Day classic, Owens was inducted into the Hall of Fame by the National Motorsports Press Association.

Buddy's all-out style would cost him several notable races that he would just as soon rather forget about, including the 1969 Texas 500, but it would also serve him well as he would pilot the Chrysler Engineering blue Daytona #88 to a new closed-course record of better than 200 mph at Talladega on March 24, 1970. When the side glass was removed in late March 1970, no stock car ever went over 200 in a NASCAR sanctioned race in 1970.
The August 1970 issue of Stock Car Racing magazine reported that Lee Roy Yarborough ran one race lap in April 1970, at 199.mph.  It was the end of an era, as restrictor plates would control the top speeds

1971–1974 

The dawn of the 70s would see the Cotton Owens Garage switch from Dodge to Plymouth, as Chrysler wanted to resurrect the marque by giving it more of a performance edge. The dominance of the Dodge Daytona and Hemi combination had given no choice to NASCAR but to outlaw both the car and the engine, requiring new restrictor plates on the superspeedways. For the 1971 season, Cotton Owens teamed up with Pete Hamilton, who would pilot his '71 Plymouth Roadrunner to victory lane at the 1971 Daytona 500 qualifier. Hamilton would start a total of 20 races, with 1 Win, 11 Top Fives, 12 Top Tens, and 2 Pole Positions. Other drivers included Charlie Glotzbach, Peter Gregg, and yet another Spartanburg native named Dick Brooks. During this era, the same car would often be re-bodied as either a Plymouth Roadrunner or a Dodge Charger, utilizing the same chassis and drivetrain but updated to keep up with NASCAR rule changes or factory dictates.

Another notable fellow to climb behind the wheel of a COG race car during this time was none other than legendary country-western musician Marty Robbins. Marty loved NASCAR racing and as he had the funds to do so, he raced occasionally. His cars were built and maintained by Cotton Owens up until he died in 1982, although he did drive Buicks for Junior Johnson shortly at the end of his career. Marty always tried to race at the big race tracks (Talladega and Daytona) every year, and then a smattering of the smaller races when time permitted.

In addition to his recordings and performances, Robbins was an avid race car driver, competing in 35 career NASCAR races with 6 Top Ten finishes, including the 1973 Firecracker 400. In 1967, Robbins played himself in the car racing film Hell on Wheels. Robbins was partial to Dodges, and owned and raced Dodge Chargers and later a 1978 Dodge Magnum in the famous purple and Day-Glo yellow paint scheme.

Car owner summary 

Cotton was fortunate to have some of the biggest names in the sport drive his cars over the years. Drivers for Cotton Owens included many legends: David Pearson, Buddy Baker, Pete Hamilton, Marty Robbins, Ralph Earnhardt, Bobby Isaac, Junior Johnson, Benny Parsons, Fireball Roberts, Mario Andretti, Charlie Glotzbach, and Al Unser. In all, a total of 25 drivers climbed behind the wheel of Owens' cars in 291 races, earning 32 victories and 29 pole positions. In total, as a car owner and as a driver, Owens' career statistics include 41 wins and 38 poles in 487 races.

Death
Seven years after being diagnosed with lung cancer, Owens died on June 7, 2012, at the age of 88, just a few weeks after it was announced he would be inducted into the NASCAR Hall of Fame's 2013 class.

Awards
Announced as a member of the 2013 Inductee Class at the NASCAR Hall of Fame on May 23, 2012.
Inducted into the South Carolina Athletic Hall of Fame in 2009.
Owens was announced as a 2008 inductee in the International Motorsports Hall of Fame.
Historic Speedway Group - Occoneechee-Orange Speedway (Hillsborough, NC) Hall of Fame Inductee (2008 ).
In 1970, Owens was inducted into the National Motorsports Press Association's Hall of Fame at Darlington Speedway.
Cotton Owens was named one of NASCAR's 50 Greatest Drivers during NASCAR's 50th Anniversary celebration in 1998.
Recipient of the Order of the Palmetto, the highest civilian honor awarded by the Governor of South Carolina, created in 1971 to recognize lifetime achievement and service to the State of South Carolina. September 16, 2006
Member Darlington Records Club
Member NASCAR Mechanics Hall of Fame
Member NASCAR Legends
Pioneer of Racing Award, Living Legends of Auto Racing, February 15, 2006
Presented with the Smokey Yunick Award for “Lifetime Achievement in Auto Racing” on May 28, 2000
Honored by the Vance County Tourism Dept., Henderson, NC with the “East Coast Drag Times Hall of Fame Motorsports Pioneer Award” on October 16, 005
Recipient of the “Car Owner’s of the 1960s” award by the Old Timer's Racing Club, 1996
Recipient of the "Mechanic of the 1960s" award by the Old Timer's Racing Club, 1998

Other notable achievements
Won NASCAR's first live televised race 
Gave Dodge its last NASCAR victory in a wing car. 
Earned Pontiac its first NASCAR win when Cotton Owens won on the old beach course at Daytona in 1957 driving a '57 Pontiac prepared by Ray Nichels.

Motorsports career results

NASCAR
(key) (Bold – Pole position awarded by qualifying time. Italics – Pole position earned by points standings or practice time. * – Most laps led.)

Grand National Series

Daytona 500

References

External links
Official Website of Cotton Owens Garage

Biography

1924 births
2012 deaths
United States Navy sailors
Burials in South Carolina
Deaths from cancer in South Carolina
Deaths from lung cancer
NASCAR drivers
NASCAR team owners
People from Union, South Carolina
Racing drivers from South Carolina
NASCAR Hall of Fame inductees
International Motorsports Hall of Fame inductees